Please Help Emily is 1917 American silent comedy-drama film starring Ann Murdock and directed by Dell Henderson. It is based on the 1916 Broadway play Please Help Emily that starred Ann Murdock. Charles Frohman's company, of whom Murdock was employed on the stage, produced the film and released it through Mutual Film. It is now a lost film.

Plot
As described in a film magazine, Professor Delmar (Hubert Druce) is sent to China to study child-life and decides to leave his daughter Emily (Murdock), who is always getting into trouble, with his good friends the Lethbridges. One night Emily runs away from a musicale and attends a cabaret. Not knowing how to explain matters and feeling sure that Trotters (McDougall), a friend, can help her out, she goes to his apartment. Waiting for him to return from the club, she takes a nap. Mrs. Lethbridge (Veness), not wishing her husband to know of Emily's escapade, tells him that Emily is staying with her aunt, who has the mumps. Trotter is told of the story and, wishing to make it good, plans to take Emily to her aunt's house. They stop at a hotel for lunch. Emily has her dog hidden and tells Trotter that it is lost and that she will not leave the hotel until it is found. Julia (Carlyle), the fiancée of Trotter, decides to visit the sick aunt. She is accompanied by Herbert Threadgold (Gottschalk) a nervous little body who is in love with Emily. Their automobile breaks down and they are forced to stay at the same hotel that Emily and Trotter are staying. Aunt Geraldine follows and they are all arrested for kidnapping Emily, but through the efforts of Lethbridge (Brown) they are all released. Julia marries Threadgold and, to avoid a scandal, Emily marries Trotter, not that either objects.

Cast
Ann Murdock as Emily Delmar
Hubert Druce as Professor Delmar
Amy Veness as Mrs. Lethbridge
Grace Carlyle as Julia Marchmont 
Katherine Stewart as Mrs. Moxon
Rex McDougall as Richard Trotter
Ferdinand Gottschalk as Herbert Threadgold
John Harwood as Francis
Jules Raucort as Rene Dufour
Halbert Brown as Honorable Samuel Lethbridge

References

External links

1917 films
American silent feature films
American films based on plays
Lost American films
1917 comedy-drama films
1910s English-language films
American black-and-white films
Mutual Film films
1917 lost films
Lost comedy-drama films
Films with screenplays by Joseph F. Poland
Films directed by Dell Henderson
1910s American films
Silent American comedy-drama films